Adam Thomson or Thompson may refer to:
Adam Bruce Thomson (1885–1976), Scottish artist
Sir Adam Thomson (1926–2000), British businessman, founder of Caledonian Airways
Sir Adam Thomson (diplomat) (born 1955), British diplomat, former Permanent Representative to NATO
Adam Thomson (rugby union) (born 1982), New Zealand rugby union footballer
Adam Thomson (Australian footballer) (born 1986), former Australian rules footballer
Adam Thompson (born 1992), Northern Ireland footballer
A. C. Thompson, American investigative journalist
Adam Thompson (tennis) (born 1982), New Zealand tennis player
Adam Thompson, former vocalist in the band Chocolate Starfish
Adam Thompson, the guitarist and lead singer of the Scottish indie rock group We Were Promised Jetpacks
Adam S. T. Thomson (1908–2000), Scottish engineer and university administrator